Dorndorf-Steudnitz is a former municipality in the district Saale-Holzland, in Thuringia, Germany. Since 1 December 2008, it is part of the town Dornburg-Camburg.

Geography of Thuringia
Grand Duchy of Saxe-Weimar-Eisenach